The Count of Monte Cristo is a 1975 television film produced by ITC Entertainment and based upon the 1844 novel The Count of Monte Cristo by Alexandre Dumas. It was directed by David Greene and starred Richard Chamberlain as Edmond Dantès, Kate Nelligan as Mercedes, Tony Curtis as Fernand Mondego, Louis Jourdan (who played Edmond Dantès in the 1961 film adaptation of the novel) as De Villefort, Donald Pleasence as Danglars, Trevor Howard as Abbé Faria, and Isabelle de Valvert as Haydee. ITC had previously produced a 39-part TV series based on the same source material, in 1956.

This film had a theatrical release across some European countries.

The film was remade in 1986 in Telugu as Veta.

Plot
The film emphasizes the theme of revenge and manipulation of characters by Dantès until the final swordfight with Mondego. The courtroom scene in which Dantès brings down crown prosecutor De Villefort is a highlight of the film, as is the scene between Dantès and Mercedes when he reveals Mondego's treachery to her (which occurs almost precisely as in the novel). However, important characters are omitted and several scenes differ from the novel. Villefort's wife for instance, never appears, and there is no mention of her ever having poisoned anyone. In the novel, it is Mondego rather than Danglars who commits suicide, and Dantès and Mondego do not engage in a swordfight. As in the novel, Dantès loses Mercedes because of his vengeful bitterness. Haydee has only a minor role in the film, and there is no confirmation that she and Monte Cristo become lovers as in the book.

Cast
 Richard Chamberlain as Edmond Dantès
 Donald Pleasence as Danglars
 Louis Jourdan as Gérard de Villefort
 Tony Curtis as Fernand Mondego
 Kate Nelligan as Mercédès
 Trevor Howard as Abbé Faria
 Dominic Guard as Albert Mondego
 Taryn Power as Valentine De Villefort
 Dominic Barto as Bertuccio
 Alessio Orano as Caderousse
 Angelo Infanti as Jacopo
 Isabelle De Valvert as Haydee
 Anthony Dawson as Noirtier De Villefort
 Harold Bromley as M. Morrell
 George Willing as Andre Morrell
 Carlo Puri as Andrea Benedetto
 Ralph Michael as M. Dantès
 Harry Baird as Ali

Characters omitted
The following participants in major sub-plots of the Dumas novel are not portrayed in the film:
 Luigi Vampa
 Maximilian Morrel
 Hermine Danglars
 Eugenie Danglars
 Lucien Debray
 Beauchamp
 Heloise Villefort
 Edouard Villefort
 Marquis Saint-Méran
 Marquise of Saint-Méran

Production
The film was produced by Norman Rosemont, who originally tried to do it as a mini series but could not sell it. Instead he signed a deal with NBC to make it as a TV movie, although the film would be released theatrically in Europe. The budget was one and a half million dollars.

Bell Telephone Company sponsored and Richard Chamberlain agreed to star. It was part of the Bell System Family Theatre.

Rosemont remembered "grave doubts were expressed by the networks about whether there was a mass audience for period pieces. They were in costume, there was the worry about accents and inevitably they would cost more than a period drama".

Filming took place in Rome starting in August 1974. There was location filming outside Marseilles.

The cast included Taryn Power, the daughter of Tyrone Power and Linda Christian.

Rosemont said: "We tried to stick as closely as possible to the novel. And with Chamberlain in the lead I've got to say the show worked out better than anyone could want".

Chamberlain called it "a great story" and said he chose not to see the previous movie versions because "I didn't want to copy even unconsciously".

Reception
The show received good ratings. Market research showed the program had good "commercial recall" and reflected well on sponsor Bell, so they wanted more. Rosemont went on to make adaptations of The Man in the Iron Mask, Captains Courageous and The Four Feathers.

Performance awards
The film was nominated for two Emmys: Richard Chamberlain for Outstanding Lead Actor in a Special Program – Drama or Comedy, and Trevor Howard for Outstanding Single Performance by a Supporting Actor in a Comedy or Drama Special.

References

External links
 
 Character relations in the Dumas novel at Wikimedia Commons

ITC Entertainment films
1970s adventure drama films
Films based on The Count of Monte Cristo
1975 television films
1975 films
Films directed by David Greene
British adventure drama films
1970s English-language films
Television shows based on The Count of Monte Cristo
1970s British films